Erkki Ensio Leikola (14 August 1900, in Artjärvi – 29 July 1986, in Helsinki; surname until 1906 Leidenius) was a Finnish physician, business executive and politician. He was a member of the Parliament of Finland from 1945 to 1951 and again from 1954 to 1962, representing the National Coalition Party. He was the younger brother of Aare Leikola.

References

1900 births
1986 deaths
People from Orimattila
People from Uusimaa Province (Grand Duchy of Finland)
National Coalition Party politicians
Members of the Parliament of Finland (1945–48)
Members of the Parliament of Finland (1948–51)
Members of the Parliament of Finland (1954–58)
Members of the Parliament of Finland (1958–62)
Finnish people of World War II
University of Helsinki alumni
Academic staff of the University of Helsinki